Derek Robertson may refer to:

 Derek Robertson (artist) (born 1967), Scottish artist
 Derek Robertson (politician), Australian politician
 Derek Robertson (footballer) (1949–2015), Scottish footballer